Nor Lines is a short sea liner shipping and logistics company based in Norway. The company operates 11 vessels in addition to disposition of the cargo sections of the Coastal Express. In addition to along the Norwegian coast, it through the subsidiary Baltic Line operates to Denmark and Finland. The company also manages truck and rail transport. It is owned Det Stavangerske Dampskibsselskap and Hurtigruten Group and was previously known as Nor-Cargo.

Shipping companies of Norway
Container shipping companies
Transport companies of Rogaland
Companies based in Stavanger
Companies with year of establishment missing